Francis Lucas Nyalali (3 February 1935 – 2 April 2003) was the Chief Justice of Tanzania from 1977 to 2000, who promoted easy access to justice, rule of law, constitutionalism, and human rights. To date, he remains the longest serving Chief Justice of Tanzania and within the Commonwealth of Nations, where an average serving time for a Chief Justice is 3.6 years.

References

1935 births
2003 deaths
Tanzanian Roman Catholics
Chief justices of Tanzania
Makerere University alumni
Tanzanian judges